Carl Jahnzon (Carl Johan Jahnzon; 29 April 1881 – 25 June 1955) was a Swedish track and field athlete who competed in the 1912 Summer Olympics. In 1912 he finished eighth in the hammer throw competition.

References

External links
Profile 

1881 births
1955 deaths
Swedish male hammer throwers
Olympic athletes of Sweden
Athletes (track and field) at the 1912 Summer Olympics